In Arabic onomastics ("nisbah"), Al-Amriki denotes a relationship to or from the United States and may refer to:

Abu Mansoor Al-Amriki, American leader of Somali Islamist militant group, al-Shabaab
Azzam al Amriki, senior al-Qaeda member, born Adam Gadahn
Abu Hurayra al-Amriki, American suicide bomber for al-Nusra Front
Abu Hamza al-Amriki,  Albanian-American Islamic State senior commander
Abu Abdul Barr al-Amriki, name bestowed by ISIL upon Las Vegas mass shooter, Stephen Paddock
Abu Taha al-Amriki, American Muslim punk musician
Ali Mohamed (double agent), "al-Amriki", "the American", CIA Islamist double agent
Jehad Mostafa, American al-Shabaab leader also known by the pseudonym "Anwar al-Amriki".

See also
Nuh Amriki, Nicholas Rovinski, Boston beheading plotter